The Academies at Roxborough High School (commonly referred to as Roxborough High School) is a public high school in Philadelphia, Pennsylvania, operated by the School District of Philadelphia and servicing the Roxborough, Manayunk, Chestnut Hill, Wissahickon, Mt. Airy, and Germantown sections of Philadelphia.

History

In 2006 school district officials stated that disorder was not increasing at Roxborough High while some teachers stated that it was.

In 2010 Manayunk resident and Philadelphia School District teacher Keith Newman criticized the school district's handling of the high school, stating that it should not be ranked as "persistently dangerous" since it is in a relatively well-to-do area. At the time he was running for election for a political position.

Roxborough alumnus Stephen Brandt made efforts to turn around the school during his time as principal. The school district had asked him, previously a Norristown School District employee, to help improve the high school. He received the 2013 Lindback Award for Distinguished Principal Leadership. In 2013 Brandt, then the outgoing principal, stated that Dana Jenkins was going to be the new principal.

In 2016 the school received a $1 million grant from the Philadelphia School Partnership.

On September 27, 2022, a mass shooting occurred outside of the school where two gunmen ambushed and fired at least 70 times at a group of football players who were finishing a football scrimmage. A 14-year-old boy died from his injuries and 4 people were wounded.

Curriculum
Roxborough has a separate Ninth Grade Academy that leads into three academies for grades 10-12: The Academy of Visual Arts Production, The Academy of Health Sciences and Research, and The Academy of Business Technology and Entrepreneurship. Roxborough High School's CTE programs include Web Design, Film and Video Production, Digital Media, Biotechnology, Kinesiology, Business Technology, and Business Applications.

Academic performance
In 2015 Jenkins stated that the graduation rate was 84%. A 2015 Philadelphia Inquirer article stated that the school, while experiencing issues involving a lack of resources, was one of the best-performing comprehensive high schools in Philadelphia.

Feeder schools
Roxborough's catchment includes those zoned to:
 Cook-Wissahickon School
 James Dobson Elementary School
 Charles W. Henry School
 Henry H. Houston Elementary School
 John Story Jenks School
 Anna L. Lingelbach School
 Thomas Mifflin School
 Shawmont School

Alumni association
The Roxborough High School Alumni Association was founded in 1927. The association assists with benefitting the school's mission and spirit, as well as funding college scholarships for high-achieving students.

Notable alumni
Buddy Harris, Major League Baseball Pitcher for Houston Astros (1970-1971)
Stanley Clarke, world-famous jazz bassist, winner of 15 Grammy awards. (1968)
Rodney Hicks, American playwright, stage, television, and film actor

External links

 Roxborough High School

Notes

Career and Technical Educations
High schools in Philadelphia
Magnet schools in Pennsylvania
Public middle schools in Pennsylvania
School District of Philadelphia
Public high schools in Pennsylvania